Sébastien Schneeberger (born August 3, 1973) is a Canadian politician and was elected the Coalition Avenir Québec member of the National Assembly of Quebec for Drummond–Bois-Francs in the 2012 Quebec election.  Earlier, he served as the Action démocratique du Québec MNA in Drummond from 2007 to 2008.

Schneeberger was born in Moutier, Canton of Bern, Switzerland, and moved to Canada at the age of 10; his father is a Swiss immigrant.

Schneeberger obtained a college diploma in agricultural exploitation and management in 1994. He worked at a local farm in the Bois-Francs region for over 10 years and later worked as a trucker, technical adviser, sales adviser and manufacturing agent for various businesses in Drummondville. He also a founder for the young businesspeople association in the Centre-du-Quebec region.

Schneeberger was first elected in the 2007 election with 39% of the vote. Parti Québécois incumbent Normand Jutras, who was running for a fourth term, finished second with 33% of the vote. Schneeberger took office on April 12, 2007 and was named the critic for aboriginal affairs until a Shadow Cabinet shuffle in May 2008. He was defeated by Yves-François Blanchet of the Parti Québécois in the 2008 election; following the electoral redistribution that preceded the 2012 election, Schneeberger won election in the new Drummond–Bois-Francs riding, while Blanchet was simultaneously reelected in the neighbouring riding of Johnson.

Footnotes

External links
 

1973 births
Living people
Coalition Avenir Québec MNAs
Action démocratique du Québec MNAs
Francophone Quebec people
People from the Bernese Jura
Swiss emigrants to Canada
21st-century Canadian politicians